The Wydown-Forsyth District, in Clayton and St. Louis, Missouri, is a  historic district which was listed on the National Register of Historic Places in 1988. It is roughly bounded by Forsyth, Skinker Blvd., Fauquier and Wydown Terrace Dr., and University Lane.  The listing included 236 contributing buildings.

It includes works by Maritz & Young and other architects.

References

Historic districts on the National Register of Historic Places in Missouri
National Register of Historic Places in St. Louis
National Register of Historic Places in St. Louis County, Missouri
Colonial Revival architecture in Missouri
Tudor Revival architecture in the United States